Sunrisers Hyderabad (often abbreviated as SRH) is a cricket franchise whose team plays in the Indian Premier League (IPL). Based in Hyderabad, Telangana, they are one of ten teams who will compete in IPL 2023. It will be their eleventh appearance in the tournament.

Background
Following SRH's eighth-place finish in IPL 2022, Tom Moody stepped down as head coach on 2 September 2022. It was his second stint in the role. Sunrisers had won the fewest matches in the two previous seasons, only nine in all. Brian Lara, SRH batting coach in 2022, has taken over as head coach for IPL 2023.

Player acquisition

Sunrisers announced their retention list on 15 November 2022, releasing twelve players from their squad including Kane Williamson, their captain in the 2022 IPL, and their most-expensive buy in the 2022 IPL auction, West Indian wicket-keeper, Nicholas Pooran. The franchise retained the remaining 12 players from their squad. The team entered the auction with the most money to spend, .

Players retained Abdul Samad, Aiden Markram, Rahul Tripathi, Glenn Phillips, Abhishek Sharma, Marco Jansen, Washington Sundar, Fazalhaq Farooqi, Kartik Tyagi, Bhuvneshwar Kumar, T. Natarajan, Umran Malik.
Players released Kane Williamson, Nicholas Pooran, Jagadeesha Suchith, Priyam Garg, Ravikumar Samarth, Romario Shepherd, Saurabh Dubey, Sean Abbott, Shashank Singh, Shreyas Gopal, Sushant Mishra, Vishnu Vinod.

Squad

 Players with international caps are listed in bold.

Administration and support staff

References

External links
Sunrisers Hyderabad official website

2023 Indian Premier League
Sunrisers Hyderabad seasons